FKY may refer to:

 Bokrijk railway station (station code), a railway station in Limburg, Belgium
 Yogyakarta Art Festival, an annual arts festivals held in Yogyakarta, Indonesia